Anopina silvertonana is a moth of the family Tortricidae first described by Obraztsov in 1962. It is found in the United States, including California, Arizona, New Mexico, Colorado and Wyoming.

The length of the forewings is 8–9.5 mm. The forewing ground color varies from whitish ocherous to brownish ocherous. The basal quarter of the forewing is brownish, mottled with chestnut brown. The hindwings are fuscous.

References

Moths described in 1962
silvertonana
Moths of North America